Gene Gaines (born June 26, 1938) was a football player in the CFL sixteen years. He starred as a defensive back for the Ottawa Rough Riders and Montreal Alouettes. As of 1994, he is a member of the Canadian Football Hall of Fame.

After leaving the David Starr Jordan Senior High School in the place of his birth in Los Angeles, California, Gene Gaines entered the nearby UCLA where he played NCAA college football with the UCLA Bruins until the 1960 NCAA Football Season. During the Summer of 1959, the movie Sergeant Rutledge was in production in Utah and Gaines and his UCLA Football Bruin teammate Marvin Luster both got one of the eleven uncredited roles as a trooper as created by the film's Director, John Ford, according to AFI.com and IMDb.com.

Like his Bruin teammate and fellow uncredited movie co-star, Marvin Luster, Gaines also rejected offers from the NFL and the AFL rival league in order to play in Canada's CFL or Canadian Football League. Gaines had turned down offers from the NFL's Pittsburgh Steelers and the AFL's San Diego Chargers in order to join the CFL's Montreal Alouettes for the 1961 season. Also joining Gaines for that first CFL season in Montreal was that old Bruin teammate and movie co-star, Marvin Luster. For the following 1962-1969 CFL seasons, Gaines moved westward less than 200km down the Trans-Canada Highway to join the Ottawa Rough Riders. But, for the 1970-1976 CFL seasons, Gaines moved back eastward down that Trans-Canada Highway to rejoin those Alouettes to finish his CFL Playing Career. During that 1961-1976 CFL career, Gaines would win four Grey Cups (his last in 1974 alongside old UCLA teammate and movie co-star Marvin Luster for whom this was a first and only win) and was a three time CFL All-Star.

In 1970, he was both a player and one of the defensive backfield coaches for the Alouettes.

Indeed, after his playing days in the CFL came to an end in 1976, Gene Gaines became a CFL Assistant Coach. He even won four Grey Cups as an Assistant Coach, thus matching his player days wins, one with the Edmonton Elks, then two with the Winnipeg Blue Bombers and finally, a last one with the B.C. Lions.

References

1938 births
Living people
American players of Canadian football
Canadian football defensive backs
Canadian Football Hall of Fame inductees
Edmonton Elks coaches
Montreal Alouettes players
Ottawa Rough Riders players
Players of American football from Los Angeles
UCLA Bruins football players
Players of Canadian football from Los Angeles
Sports coaches from Los Angeles